Emery County is a county in east-central Utah, United States. As of the 2010 United States Census, the population was 10,976. Its county seat is Castle Dale, and the largest city is Huntington.

History

Prehistory

Occupation of the San Rafael region dates back thousands of years to include people of the Desert Archaic Culture who were followed by those of the Fremont culture who inhabited present-day Emery County through the sixth through thirteenth centuries AD. Evidence of these civilizations is extant in numerous pictograph and petroglyph panels, such as those in Temple Mountain Wash, Muddy Creek, Ferron Box, Black Dragon Canyon, and Buckhorn Wash - all sites listed in the National Register of Historic Places. Ute Indians also occupied sites in Castle Valley,

Old Spanish Trail
The first non-indigenous persons to view Castle Valley were Spanish Traders and Explorers. The first of record was Silvestre Vélez de Escalante; in 1776, he crossed northern Utah through the Uintah Basin. Spanish traders and explorers soon found a more southerly route, and their path became known as the Old Spanish Trail. It began at Santa Fe, to Durango, Colorado, crossed the Colorado River (then known as Grand River) near present-day Moab, then to the Green River-crossing where Green River is now located, thence westerly to Cedar Mountain. It went on the South side of Cedar Mountain, across Buckhorn Flat, passed the Red Seeps to Huntington Creek, crossing about a mile below where the present bridge crosses; thence to Cottonwood Creek. It crossed the Ferron Creek where Molen now stands. It passed through the Rochester Flats about one mile (1.6 km) east of present-day Moore and crossed the Muddy Creek about two miles (3 km) due east of the present town of Emery. 
It then went over Salina (Salt Creek) Canyon. It then turned south and went through Parowan, Mountain Meadows, Las Vegas Nevada, Barstow California, and to the coast. This Trail had to traverse Castle Valley to skirt the steep-walled canyons of the San Juan, Colorado, Green, Dirty Devil, and San Rafael Rivers.

Slavery was the principal trade between Santa Fe and the Utah region. The trading of Indian women and children to the Spanish, although illegal, was the purpose of the Spanish coming into the area to become Utah. The other use of the trail was to herd livestock, mostly horses, from California to Santa Fe. Since the slave trade was illegal, the traders kept neither records of their activities nor the extent of their travels and explorations. Travelers along the Old Spanish Trail gave Castle Valley its names, as the travelers marveled at the imposing rock formations.

Early explorers
The first Americans to come to Castle Valley were fur trappers, including the "lost trappers", James Workman and William Spencer, who had been separated from their trapping party by Comanche Indians and had wandered to the Moab crossing of the Colorado River hoping that they would find Santa Fe. They met a Spanish caravan of forty or fifty people going to California. They joined the caravan and traveled through Castle Valley in 1809 and went on to California. In 1830, William Wilfskill came to Castle Valley along the Spanish Trail. He and his party were fur trappers but found little in the area to keep them here.

Following the trappers in the late 1840s and early 1850s, government explorers came to the valley seeking usable overland routes across the continent. Kit Carson was the first of these famous men. He was looking for a direct route for the mail to be carried overland from St. Louis to California. Carson carried through Castle Valley to the nation the news of gold being found in the Sierra Nevada in 1848.

In 1853 John W. Gunnison, an Army Topographical Engineer came through Castle Valley, plotting a railroad route. He was commissioned for this assignment by the US Secretary of War Jefferson Davis. He left detailed descriptions of his travels and carefully laid out his route through Castle Valley. Gunnison's route first met the Spanish Trail at the Green River crossing. He followed this trail for a short distance west of the Green River, but when the Spanish Trail entered a rugged rocky region (Sinbad Reef) he charted a route around this feature.

The third government explorer was John C. Fremont, in the winter of 1853–54. The cold weather heavily impacted his trip. They suffered from a lack of food and from the inhospitable landscape. There was no relief from their difficulties until they left Castle Valley and made their way to the small Mormon settlement of Parowan.

Arrival of pioneers
In 1875 livestock growers from Sanpete County brought cattle and sheep into Castle Valley to graze, and several recognized the settlement potential of the region. With a shortage of sufficient land and water in Sanpete County and a strong desire by LDS Church leaders to acquire unoccupied land in the region before non-Mormons did, young families began moving into Castle Valley in the fall of 1877 to homestead in the future sites of Huntington, Ferron, Castle Dale, and Orangeville.

In late August 1877, Brigham Young, president of the Church of Jesus Christ of Latter-day Saints (LDS Church), issued an order to the Sanpete LDS Stake president seeking ". . . at least fifty families [to] locate in Castle Valley this fall." The order led to the last Mormon colony settled under the direction of Brigham Young. One week later on August 29, Young, the Great Colonizer, died. During his 30 years as leader of the LDS Church, Young had overseen and directed the establishment of almost 400 towns and villages. The settlement of Emery County was his last.

Soon after the issuance of Young's order, several bands of settlers moved out from the Sanpete region and headed for Castle Valley (Emery County). They settled along Huntington Creek, Cottonwood Creek, and Ferron Creek. The following spring (1878), several more families arrived. In the spring of 1878, Elias Cox and Charles Hollingshead set up a sawmill in Huntington Canyon to support the colony. On Ferron Creek, settlers plowed lands and began the construction of a ditch for irrigation. Most early settlers in Castle Valley claimed easily watered bottom lands along the creeks and rivers, and by 1879, most of the best lands had been taken up.

The Utah Territorial Legislature created Emery County on February 12, 1880. The description included the future Carbon County area. It was named for George W. Emery, the Utah Territory governor whose term was ending as the act was being debated. The 1880 census showed 556 people and 84 farms in Emery County, but this figure is likely short as many prominent settlers were inadvertently left off the county rolls. By 1890, the population of Emery County had risen to 2,866. Between 1880 and 1900, many significant canals were constructed, including the Huntington Canal (1884), Emery Canal (1885), Cleveland Canal (1885), and the Wakefield Ditch (1880). Many of the early canals are still in service. The county boundaries were altered in 1880 and 1890. In 1894 the north portion of the county was partitioned off to create Carbon County. The county boundaries remained intact after that, except for a small adjustment in the city of Green River in 2003.

In the early 1880s, the Denver and Rio Grande Western Railroad contemplated possible routings through the Emery County region. Early plans to locate the railroad through the heart of Emery County were thwarted when the route over the Wasatch Range was too steep. The route was moved to the NE part of the county, bypassing most settlements. Most of the county thus missed on economic opportunities brought by the railroad, but Green River, on the east county border, quickly boomed after the rails arrived.

Twentieth Century

Emery County population passed 4,600 by 1900, with 450+ farms and  under cultivation. Irrigation systems were being expanded to bring new lands into production, bringing problems that would plague the region for several decades. Water rights conflicts frequently arose, and water theft, known as "midnight irrigation," became common. Most disputes were settled by decree, but a few were contested by violence.

The underlying soils in Emery County consist of ancient seabeds which contain high levels of salts. Poor drainage and over-irrigation cause the salts to collect on the surface, rendering large land areas unsuitable for agriculture. The problem first appeared in the 1890s, and in 1903, a Department of Agriculture report stated that over 30% of the developed farmland in Emery County had been abandoned due to degradation.

With expanded irrigation development came expanded settlement as several new towns were established. In addition, the coal industry, which had consisted of small mines to cover local demand, had significantly expanded, with several large-scale operations starting in the county. The US entry into The Great War created a minor boom in Emery County as agricultural prices rose and manpower shortages caused wages at the mines to rise. Following the war, prices dropped significantly, leading to hard times throughout much of the 1920s. Things improved somewhat during the later years of the decade, but an even more significant collapse came with the onset of the Great Depression in the early 1930s. In addition, severe drought in 1931 and 1934 intensified the economic hardship in the county.

The 1930s were difficult for Emery County residents. The county population dropped by 5% from 1920 to 1930, although it remained somewhat steady after that. Agricultural prices dropped 40% from their 1929 level, and coal production dropped by half. Water shortages and land degradation continued to be problems. In 1935, only  out of  produced crops.

The residents did benefit from several depression-relief programs, including the Civilian Conservation Corps (CCC), which established several CCC camps in the county. Company 959 established a camp in Joes Valley in May 1933. The camp moved several times in the following years before establishing a permanent camp near Ferron in 1935. A second camp was established at Castle Dale in 1935, and another camp was established at Green River in 1938. During its tenure in Emery County, the CCC built roads, bridges, and trails, as well as building ranger stations and other projects on public lands. Many enrollees settled in Emery County after their discharge from the Corps.

Following the end of World War II, Emery County veterans returned to find relative economic prosperity. County farm income in 1946 was double that of 1940, and the coal mines were operating at fairly high levels. During the post-war years, the county matured and modernized as modern water and sanitation systems were constructed, roads were improved, and many of the luxuries enjoyed by people in less rural areas, like telephones, reached Emery County. While many things in Emery County improved, some things did not. The agricultural sector still suffered from inconsistent water supplies and a lack of significant long-term water storage. And in the mid-1950s, the region again experienced near-drought conditions. It was during this period that a water reservoir in Joes Valley was completed.

Riding the crest of national economic growth during the 1970s, Emery County's population grew significantly as a result of the construction of large coal-fired power plants in Castle Dale and Huntington by Utah Power & Light Company (PacifiCorp) and the expansion of coal mines to fuel them.

Recent
The collapse registered recorded seismic waves in magnitude 3.9 to 4.0, by seismograph stations of the University of Utah. 
Emery County, the state's No. 2 coal-producing county, was also the site of a fire that killed 27 people in the Wilberg Mine in December 1984.

Geography
The Green River flows southward along the east side of the county. The Price River flows southeastward through the northeastern corner of the county to its discharge point into the Green on the county's eastern border. The San Rafael River rises in the northwestern part of the county and cuts its way across the county's central areas before discharging into the Green, several miles south of the city of Green River. The county terrain is rough flat areas broken by mountain ranges and ridges and carved by water erosion, generally sloping to the south and east. The county's highest point is 10,743' (3274m) ASL, in the Central Utah Plateaus on the county's main north border. The Wasatch Plateau, a mountainous area, sits along the western boundary. The main population of the county lives along the base of these mountains. The San Rafael Swell occupies most of the area to the east.

The western side of the county is the most populated and contains numerous small communities residing in an agricultural valley that roughly parallels the Manti National Forest to the west. Streams originate in the Wasatch Plateau in the forest, and their headwaters are stored in several reservoirs. Agricultural areas depend on these reservoirs and waterways for survival, and some farmland communities struggle with excess salinity. The east side of the county is dry with rough terrain. Green River, the largest community on this side of the county, is more closely tied to the communities and economy of Grand County. Emery County's maps show the importance of the forest lands to the local communities as there are few significant groundwater aquifers in the area.

Emery County contains three areas: the mountainous Wasatch Plateau to the west; Castle Valley, where the major settlements are located; and the desert of the San Rafael Swell, the San Rafael Reef, Cedar Mountain, and the remote stretches on the east.

The San Rafael River, the lifeblood of the county, originates in the Wasatch Plateau, where the headwaters are stored in several reservoirs for agricultural and industrial use. It flows into Castle Valley in three branches—Huntington Creek, Cottonwood Creek, and Ferron Creek—which unite to form the San Rafael River after they pass the communities and adjacent farmland. It then twists its way through the rock and desert to its junction with the Green River.

Geographical names feature Native American, Spanish and English influences. Two Ute Indian names: Wasatch, a gap in the mountains; Quitchupah, a place where animals fare poorly. Wasatch is the name of the plateau between the Sanpete Valley and the Castle Valley. Quitchupah is a small creek south of Emery. The Spanish name is still used in San Rafael, which means Saint Ralph. During Spanish times, the name Rafael was also given to the present Ferron Creek. In 1873, A.D. Ferron, the surveyor sent by Washington to perform cadastral surveys of eastern Utah, named this creek, but before this time, it was the Rafael. The Ute  Indians called it the Cabulla, which refers to the small edible part of cactus pear. Huntington Creek was originally called San Marcus; Ute Indians called it Sivareeche, and the Spanish called it Mateo. The Indians called Castle Valley Tompin-con-tu or rock house land, which relates to the present Castle Valley. The Spanish named the valley St. Joseph's Valley.

Archaeology
Range Creek rises in Emery County and has recently been shown to have pristine remains of the Fremont culture. The State of Utah owns the site and is currently identifying the remains and developing a long-term conservation plan.

Major highways

 United States Interstate I-70
 United States US-191
 Utah State Highway UT-10
 Utah State Highway UT-24
 Utah State Highway UT-29
 Utah State Highway UT-31

Adjacent counties

 Carbon County - north
 Uintah County - northeast
 Grand County - east
 San Juan County - southeast
 Wayne County - south
 Sevier County - southwest
 Sanpete County - northwest

Protected areas

 Cedar Mountain Recreation Area
 Goblin Valley State Park
 Green River State Park
 Huntington State Park
 Manti-La Sal National Forest (part)
 Millsite State Park

Lakes

 Aldys Hole
 Antelope Valley Number Three Reservoir
 Barewire Pond
 Baseball Pond
 Big Hole
 Big Hole Pond
 Big Pond
 Black Dragon Reservoir
 Blue Flat Reservoir
 Blue Pond
 Broken Pond
 Buckhorn Reservoir
 Buckmaster Reservoir
 C C C Pond
 Canyon Pond
 Cat Pond
 Chris Pond
 Cinderella Reservoir
 Cistern Tanks
 Cleveland Reservoir
 Cloyds Pond
 Clyde and Neils Pond
 Cow Flat Reservoir
 Cow Tanks
 Desert Lake
 Desert Reservoir Number 2
 Dinner Pond
 Diversion Hollow Debris Basin Reservoir
 Dog Hollow Reservoir
 Dog Ponds
 Drought Relief Reservoir
 Dry Pond
 Dry X Reservoir
 Dugway Reservoir
 Dutch Flat Reservoir
 Electric Lake
 Emery Plant Reservoir
 Farnsworth Tanks
 Forked Post Pond
 Goodwater Reservoir
 Greasewood Tank
 Guymon Pond
 Hadden Pit
 Hadden Reservoir
 Horse Bench Reservoir
 Horse Heaven Reservoir
 Huntington Lake
 Huntington Reservoir
 Hyde Draw Reservoir
 Indian Hollow Debris Basin Reservoir
 J J Reservoir
 Jim Wilson Reservoir
 Job Corps Pond
 Joes Holes
 Joes Valley Reservoir
 Johansen Pond
 Jorgensen Pond
 Kiahtipes Reservoir
 Kirby Pond
 Lews Hole
 Little Blue Pond
 Little Holes
 Lone Tree Reservoir
 Long Point Number 3 Reservoir
 Lynns Pond
 Merrials Pond
 Midway Reservoir
 Miller Flat Reservoir (partially)
 Millsite Reservoir
 Molen Tanks
 Moonshine Waterhole
 Mormon Tanks
 Mounds Reservoir
 Mussentuchit Reservoir
 Ninemile Reservoir
 Olsen Reservoir
 Orsons Pond
 Oscars Pond
 Petes Hole
 Pilling Pond
 Potters Ponds
 Rattlesnake Reservoir
 Red Point Reservoir
 Reid Neilson Reservoir
 Road End Reservoir
 Road Hollow Reservoir
 Rochester Reservoir
 Rock Reservoir
 Round Knoll Pond
 Russel Pond
 Saleratus Reservoir
 Sand Bench Reservoir
 Sand Pond
 Saucer Basin Reservoir
 Short Canyon Reservoir
 Sids Holes
 Sids Reservoir
 Sinkhole Reservoir
 Slaughter Slopes Reservoir
 Smith Pond
 Snow Lake
 South Ferron Reservoir
 South Sand Reservoir
 Southeast Mounds Reservoir
 State Pond
 Straight Hollow North Debris Basin Reservoir
 Straight Hollow South Debris Basin Reservoir
 Summit Pond
 Swazy Hole
 The Big Pond
 Three Coves Reservoir
 Trail Reservoir
 Twin Ponds
 Wedge Pond Number 1
 Wedge Pond Number 2
 Wedge Pond Number 4
 West Clawson Reservoir
 Wests Reservoir
 Woodpile Pond
 Wrigley Springs Reservoir (partially)
 Zwahlen Wash Debris Basin Reservoir

Demographics

As of the 2000 United States Census, there were 10,860 people, 3,468 households, and 2,798 families in the county. The population density was 2.43/sqmi (0.94/km2). There were 4,093 housing units at an average density of 0.92/sqmi (0.35/km2). The racial makeup of the county was 95.64% White, 0.18% Black or African American, 0.65% Native American, 0.31% Asian, 0.10% Pacific Islander, 1.87% from other races, and 1.24% from two or more races.  5.23% of the population were Hispanic or Latino of any race.

There were 3,468 households, out of which 45.90% had children under the age of 18 living with them, 69.80% were married couples living together, 7.20% had a female householder with no husband present, and 19.30% were non-families. 17.60% of all households were made up of individuals, and 8.10% had someone living alone who was 65 years of age or older. The average household size was 3.10, and the average family size was 3.53.

The county population contained 35.40% under the age of 18, 9.60% from 18 to 24, 24.10% from 25 to 44, 20.90% from 45 to 64, and 10.10% who were 65 years of age or older. The median age was 30 years. For every 100 females, there were 100.80 males. For every 100 females aged 18 and over, there were 97.50 males.

The median income for a household in the county was $39,850, and the median income for a family was $44,086. Males had a median income of $39,059 versus $18,929 for females. The per capita income for the county was $14,243.  About 9.40% of families and 11.50% of the population were below the poverty line, including 14.00% of those under age 18 and 8.10% of those aged 65 or over.

As of 2015, the largest self-reported ancestry groups in Emery County, Utah are:

Economy

Livestock and farming were the mainstays of Emery County's economy for much of its history. The opening of large coal mines and the construction of large power plants in Castle Dale and Huntington in the 1970s changed the economy, and the population grew sharply. High wages in this sector initially created high average incomes, but depressed markets for coal and coalbed methane, along with improvements in mining technology, have slowed or postponed this sector for some time.

As a result, unemployment has remained higher than that of the State since 1990. The County still contains extensive natural resources that could be tapped, but the jobs produced from new mining activity may be at a similar level as those replaced by technology.

A proposed nuclear power plant, the Blue Castle Project, is set to begin construction near Green River in 2023.

Education
Emery County School District operates public schools in the county.
 Emery High School
 Green River High School
 Canyon View Middle School
 San Rafael Middle School
 Ferron Elementary 
 Cleveland Elementary
 Huntington Elementary
 Cottonwood Elementary
 Book Cliff Elementary
 Castle Dale Elementary

Media
 The Castle Valley Review (Monthly)
 Emery County Progress (Weekly)

Transportation

Airports
 Green River Municipal Airport (U34) = Green River
 Huntington Municipal Airport (69V) - Huntington

Events

 Cleveland Days
 Elmo Horse and Buggy Days
 Emery (town) Days
 Emery County Fair
 Ferron Peach Days
 Green River Melon Days
 Huntington Heritage Days
 San Rafael Swell Mountain Bike Festival
 Joe's Valley Bouldering Festival

Attractions

 Joe's Valley Reservoir
 San Rafael Reef
 San Rafael Swell
 Buckhorn Draw Pictograph Panel
 The Wedge
 Huntington Reservoir
 Cottonwood Canyon
 Goblin Valley State Park
 Rochester Rock Art Panel
 The historic Emery LDS Church

Politics and Government
Like most of Utah, Emery County is reliably Republican. In only one national election since 1964, the county selected the Democratic Party candidate.

Communities

Cities

 Castle Dale (county seat)
 Ferron
 Green River
 Huntington
 Orangeville

Towns

 Clawson
 Cleveland
 Elmo
 Emery

Unincorporated communities
 Hiawatha (part)
 Lawrence
 Molen
 Moore

Former communities

 Connellsville
 Desert Lake
 Mohrland
 Victor
 Wilsonville
 Woodside

In popular culture
 The scenes for planet Vulcan in the 2009 film Star Trek were filmed near Green River.
 Scenes where Tim Allen battles a giant rock monster called "Gorignak" in the 1999 film Galaxy Quest were filmed at Goblin Valley State Park.
 The music video for 2008 single, "Human", by The Killers, was filmed in Goblin Valley.

Gallery

See also

 List of counties in Utah
 Emery County Cabin
 National Register of Historic Places listings in Emery County, Utah

References

Further reading

External links

 

 
1880 establishments in Utah Territory
Populated places established in 1880